Franco Agamenone (born 15 April 1993) is an Italian–Argentine tennis player.

Agamenone has a career high ATP singles ranking of World No. 108 achieved on 1 August 2022. He also has a career high doubles ranking of World No. 167 achieved on 15 October 2018.
He has won 5 ATP Challenger titles, three in singles and two in doubles.

Doping
Agamenone was suspended from March 2019 until January 2020 for doping.

Personal life
In September 2020, Agamenone decided to represent Italy instead of Argentina.

Career

2022: Grand Slam, Top 150, ATP debut & first semifinal 
He made his Grand Slam debut when he entered the 2022 French Open main draw as a lucky loser.
As a result he reached the top 150 at World No. 148 on 6 July 2022.

He qualified for the 2022 Croatia Open Umag making his ATP debut and reached the quarterfinals defeating Laslo Djere for his first ATP win and fourth seed & World No. 32 Sebastian Baez.
Next he defeated Marco Cecchinato to reach the first ATP semifinal of his career. As a result he moved close to 30 positions in the rankings in the top 110.

Challenger and Futures finals

Singles: 22 (12–10)

Doubles: 54 (40–14)

References

External links
 
 

1993 births
Living people
Italian male tennis players
Argentine male tennis players
People from Río Cuarto, Córdoba
Tennis players from Buenos Aires
Doping cases in tennis